William Eich is an American lawyer and retired judge.  He was Chief Judge of the Wisconsin Court of Appeals from 1989 to 1998.  Earlier in his career, he served as a state judge in Dane County, Wisconsin.

Biography
Eich was born in Park Ridge, Illinois. He graduated from Maine East High School in 1956,  Beloit College in 1960 and the University of Wisconsin Law School in 1963. Eich and his wife, Lynne, have four children. Eich has published in law reviews and legal periodicals on a variety of legal and government-related topics.

Career
After practicing with a private law firm in Madison, Wisconsin, Eich served as an Assistant and Deputy Attorney General of Wisconsin with Attorneys General Bronson La Follette and Robert W. Warren. In 1971, Governor Patrick Lucey appointed Eich as Chairman of the Public Service Commission of Wisconsin. Lucey later appointed Eich to be a Judge of the Wisconsin Circuit Court in 1975. Eich was appointed to the Court of Appeals by Governor Tony Earl in 1985. He later became chief judge in 1989 and remained in that position until 1998 before retiring in 2000. Since retiring from full-time judicial service, he has remained a reserve judge for the Circuit Court and served as a legal advisor to the Wisconsin State Journal.

References

People from Park Ridge, Illinois
Politicians from Madison, Wisconsin
Wisconsin Court of Appeals judges
Wisconsin lawyers
Beloit College alumni
University of Wisconsin Law School alumni
Living people
Year of birth missing (living people)
Lawyers from Madison, Wisconsin